The 2008–09 Swiss Super League was the 112th season of top-tier football in Switzerland. The competition is officially named AXPO Super League due to sponsoring purposes. It began on 18 July 2008 with a match between Young Boys Bern and reigning champions FC Basel, which the latter won by 2–1. The last matches were played in May 2009.

Teams
FC Thun were relegated after finishing in 10th and last place in 2007–08 Swiss Super League. They were replaced by Challenge League 2007–08 champions FC Vaduz, who are the first team from Liechtenstein participating in Switzerland's top football league.

9th placed FC St. Gallen and Challenge League runners-up AC Bellinzona competed in a two-legged relegation play-off after the end of last season. Bellinzona won 5–2 on aggregate and thus earned promotion, while St. Gallen were relegated.

League table

Results
Teams play each other four times in this league. In the first half of the season each team played every other team twice (home and away) and then do the same in the second half of the season.

First half of season

Second half of season

Relegation play-offs
FC Lucern as 9th-placed team of the Super League were played a two-legged play-off against Challenge League runners-up AC Lugano.

Luzern won 5–1 on aggregate.

Top goalscorers
Updated on 24 May 2009; Source: football.ch

Awards
Super League Player of the Year: Seydou Doumbia (BSC Young Boys)
Goal of the Year: Fabian Frei (FC Basel, scored against FC Aarau)
Coach of the Year: Bernard Challandes (FC Zürich)
Youngster of the Year: Valentin Stocker (FC Basel)
Fair Play Trophy: FC Aarau

External links
 Super league website 
 soccerway.com

Swiss Super League seasons
Swiss
1